William Lammie Frame (7 May 1912 – 1992) was a Scottish-born footballer, who played as a full back between the 1930s and 1950s.

He was born in Carluke and played for the Glasgow-based Shawfield club before moving to Leicester City in October 1933, going on to make 459 senior appearances for them (including wartime games). He made his debut for the Foxes against Tottenham Hotspur, during which he scored an own goal. He left the club in 1950 and went to play for Rugby Town.

References 

English Football League players
Shawfield F.C. players
Leicester City F.C. players
1912 births
1992 deaths
Association football fullbacks
Rugby Town F.C. players
People from Carluke
Footballers from South Lanarkshire
Scottish Junior Football Association players
Scottish footballers